Rhyncholampas is a genus of echinoderms belonging to the family Cassidulidae.

The species of this genus are found in Europe and Northern America.

Species:

Rhyncholampas pacificus 
Rhyncholampas caribaearum

References

Cassidulidae
Echinoidea genera